Andarud or Andrud or Andarood may refer to:
 Andarud-e Olya, East Azerbaijan Province
 Andarud-e Sofla, East Azerbaijan Province
 Andarud, Mazandaran